The Serjeant Surgeon is the senior surgeon in the Medical Household of the Royal Household of the Sovereign of the United Kingdom. The origin of the post dates back to 1253. Early serjeant surgeons were military surgeons who followed their king into battle.

John Arderne, later famous as the Father of Proctology, accompanied Edward III at the Battle of Crecy in 1346. But the title did not refer to a military rank; the word "serjeant" comes from the Latin "serviens" or "serving".

Over the years, other duties of the Serjeant Surgeon have included embalming of the royal corpse, oversight of torture to ensure the prisoner was not killed, and the screening of applicants to be touched by the king for the cure of the King's evil (tuberculous glands of the neck).

The first knighthood to be granted to a serjeant surgeon was in the reign of Henry VIII, to John Aylef, who was said to have cured the king of a fistula. The first serjeant surgeon to receive a peerage was Joseph Lister, the founder of antiseptic surgery, who was created Baron Lister of Lyme Regis in the County of Dorset by Queen Victoria.

Pre-twentieth century

Claudius Amyand 1715-1740
Robert Adair 1773-1789
Robert Keate FRCS 1841
Benjamin Travers 1857–1858
Sir William Lawrence, Bt FRCS FRS 1858
Caesar Hawkins FRS 1862
Sir Prescott Hewett, 1st Bt. 1884
Sir James Paget
Joseph Lister, 1st Baron Lister 1900 (to Queen Victoria)

List of serjeant surgeons from the beginning of the twentieth century
Joseph Lister, 1st Baron Lister, OM, FRS 1901 (re-appointed to King Edward VII)
Colonel Sir Frederick Treves Bt GCVO CB 1902-1910
Major-General Sir Richard Havelock Charles, 1st Baronet 1910-1928
Colonel Sir Hugh Rigby Bt KCVO 1928-1932
Wilfred Trotter MD MS FRCS FRS 1932-1939
Sir Thomas Dunhill KCVO CMG 1928-1957
Brigadier Sir Arthur Porritt Bt  KCVO CBE MA MB MChir FRCS 1946-1966
Sir Ralph Marnham KCVO MChir FRCS 1967-1971
Sir Edward Muir KCVO MS FRCS 1972-1973
Sir Edward Tuckwell KCVO MCh FRCS 1973-1975
Sir Hugh Lockhart-Mummery KCVO MD MChir FRCS LRCP 1975-1983
Sir William Slack KCVO MD MCh BM FRCS 1983-1990
John Leonard Dawson CVO MS FRCS 1990-1991
Sir Barry Jackson MS FRCS 1991-2001
Adam Lewis CVO 2001-2006
Sir Roger Vickers KCVOFRCS 2006-10
George Hamilton CVO MD FRCS 2010-2016
Satyajit Bhattacharya LVO MB MS MPhil FRCS 2016-
Ranan DasGupta MA MD MRCS FRCS(Urol) 2023-

Honorary serjeant surgeons
Sir William MacCormac, Bt., KCB, KCVO 1901 
Sir Thomas Smith, Bt. 1901-1909 
Sir Frederick Treves, Bt., GCVO, CH, FRCS 1901 (he was appointed Serjeant Surgeon the following year)

References

Positions within the British Royal Household